Aris Akropotamos F.C. is a Greek football club based in Akropotamos, Kavala.

History
The year 1975 on the initiative of the unforgettable Chatzistavrou Ippokratis the team named ARIS. Team begins to take part officially in the local leagues. Unfortunately in a car accident Chatzistavrou Ippokratis dies and the team continues with chairman Deligiorgis Nicholas.

The next season 1976-1977 with their managers Koutoulas Georgios, Chatziandreou Iraklis, Chrysostomos Konstantinidis, promotes category (b local). The group begins take the lead with the unique purpose the promotion in the A category of Eps Kavala. The end of the championship however finds it to second place losing the promotion with just two defeats from Iraklis Kavala and the Phrixus Platanotopos at the local derby.

The season 1983-1984 the management make the big "bang" and hires coach Pavlos Kopsacheilis, player of Panathinaikos 1969-1971 big team who reached the final of the UEFA Champions League.

In the following years the team is between b and c category of Eps Kavala. Served by presidents: Gravanis Athanasios, Pateras Mixail, Makaridis Stavros, Iosifidis Iosif and Sarrinikolaou Vasileios which served the longest period.

The 2003-2004 season is crowned champion in C category and following years continued with very good appearances in B category.

From the 2007-2008 season and today with chairman Christos Paraskevas, framed by a group of people to support him, the team promotes almost every year category culminating with participation in the regional championship of the fourth national.

The 2010-2011 season participates in the final of the Cup of Eps Kavala and crowned Cup Champion defeating A.E Piereon 2-0.

The 2011-2012 season in his first participation in the regional championship takes the second position and reaches back to the Cup final but loses the trophy from Orpheas Eleftheroupoli.

Honors

Domestic Titles and honors
 Fourth Division: 1
 2013
 Kavala Regional Cup: 1 
 2011

References

External links
 https://web.archive.org/web/20130925121236/http://arisakropotamoufc.gr/

Football clubs in Eastern Macedonia and Thrace
Kavala (regional unit)